Evwreni is a town in Ughelli North Local Government Area of Delta State, Nigeria.

Evwreni is a Clan made of communities (quarters).

It is an oil-producing area, which has about 14 oil wells, glow and compressor stations operated by the Shell Petroleum Development Company of Nigeria, which produces 15,000 barrels of crude daily from the area since 1996.

It is 154.6 kilometres by road to Port Harcourt and 45.3 kilometres to Warri.

Populated places in Delta State